This article contains a list of German Formula Three champions. The championship has been in existence intermittently since 1950 and has some former champions who later made Formula One. The most notable among these are seven-times world champion Michael Schumacher, 2004 Monaco Grand Prix winner Jarno Trulli and multiple podium finisher Nick Heidfeld. Nine-time 24 Hours of Le Mans winner Tom Kristensen and 2005 DTM champion Gary Paffett also won the series early in their respective careers.

By season

By driver nationality

By team

References

German Formula Three champions
German Formula Three Championship
German Formula Three